The Lander County High School, at 130 Sixth St. in Austin, Nevada, is a two-story concrete and brick school building built in 1926 with a connected, matching gymnasium that was built in 1928.  It was designed by Reno, Nevada architects George A. Ferris and Son.  It was built originally as a K-12 combined school, built from proceeds of a $55,000 bond.  It has since also been known as Austin High School and, in 1999, as Austin Elementary School.  It was listed on the National Register of Historic Places in 2000;  the listing included both buildings as contributing buildings.

Both buildings in the complex are symmetrical and have an "ordered appearance drawn from an Italian Renaissance-Palazzo style, and both are constructed predominantly of a warm golden-buff or sandstone colored brick with shaped galvanized iron dentil detailed cornices running around the majority of the buildings' exteriors."

The complex is included within the area of the 1971-NRHP-listed Austin Historic District, listed as a gold rush-era mining community, but was not 50 years old and was not considered a contributing property in that district.

References 

School buildings on the National Register of Historic Places in Nevada
Renaissance Revival architecture in Nevada
School buildings completed in 1926
Schools in Lander County, Nevada
National Register of Historic Places in Lander County, Nevada
Austin, Nevada
1926 establishments in Nevada